John Anthony Aniston (born Yannis Anastassakis, July 24, 1933 – November 11, 2022) was a Greek-born American actor who played Victor Kiriakis on the NBC daytime drama series Days of Our Lives, which he originated in July 1985 and played on and off for 37 years, until his death in 2022. His portrayal earned him a Daytime Emmy Award nomination for Outstanding Supporting Actor in a Drama Series in 2017 and he received a Daytime Emmy Lifetime Achievement Award in 2022. He is the father of actress Jennifer Aniston.

Early life
Aniston was born in Chania on the island of Crete, Greece, on July 24, 1933, to Stella Joanne (née Koume; 1899–1992) and Antonios Anastassakis (1889–1965). The family left Crete for the United States when Aniston was two years old; his father anglicized the family’s names on arriving in America. The family settled in Chester, Pennsylvania, where they operated a restaurant.

Aniston graduated from Pennsylvania State University with a bachelor's degree in theater arts. While at Penn State, he became a member of Alpha Chi Rho fraternity. After college, he served in the United States Navy as an intelligence officer on active duty in Panama and later in the Reserve, attaining the rank of lieutenant commander.

Career
Aniston began his acting career in 1962 in 87th Precinct as "Officer #1" in the episode "New Man in the Precinct". He has appeared in soap operas regularly since 1970, when he first joined Days of Our Lives as a character named Eric Richards. In 1975, he joined the cast of Love of Life as Eddie Aleata, appearing through 1978. He played Mary Stuart's new love interest, Martin Tourneur, on Search for Tomorrow from 1980 until April 1984. He returned to the cast of Days of Our Lives a second time, this time as Victor Kiriakis, in July 1985, and continued to play the role until his death. He was nominated for the 2017 Daytime Emmy Award for Outstanding Supporting Actor in a Drama Series for his performance.

In April 2022, it was announced that Aniston would receive a Daytime Emmy Lifetime Achievement Award at the 49th Annual Daytime Creative Arts & Lifestyle Emmy Awards on June 18.

Aniston also played small roles on the television series Airwolf in the season two episode "Short Walk to Freedom", Gilmore Girls as Douglas Swope in the 2002 episode "A Deep Fried Korean Thanksgiving", The West Wing as Alexander Thompson in the episodes "Game On" and "Debate Camp" (both in 2002), as the First IMF Captain in the 1969 Mission Impossible episode "Time Bomb". Aniston has also made guest appearances on Combat! (1964), My Big Fat Greek Life (2002), Star Trek: Voyager (2001), American Dreams (with Days co-star Frances Reid), Journeyman, and Mad Men.

Personal life
Aniston had a daughter, Jennifer Aniston (born 1969), with his first wife, Nancy Dow, and a son, Alexander, with his second wife, Sherry Rooney (whom he met while co-starring on Love of Life). His daughter Jennifer's godfather was Telly Savalas, one of his best friends.

Aniston died on November 11, 2022, at the age of 89.

Filmography

Awards and nominations

References

External links

 
 

1933 births
2022 deaths
20th-century American male actors
21st-century American male actors
American male soap opera actors
American male television actors
Greek male film actors
Greek emigrants to the United States
American expatriates in England
Jennifer Aniston
Male actors from Crete
Male actors from Pennsylvania
Military personnel from Pennsylvania
Penn State College of Arts and Architecture alumni
People from Chania
Place of death missing
United States Navy officers